The Canberra Deep Space Communication Complex (CDSCC) is a satellite communication station, part of the Deep Space Network of NASA's Jet Propulsion Laboratory (JPL), located at Tidbinbilla in the Australian Capital Territory.  Opened in 1965, the complex was used for tracking the Apollo Lunar Module, and along with its two sister stations at Goldstone, California and Madrid, Spain is now used for tracking and communicating with NASA's spacecraft, particularly interplanetary missions. Its DSS-43 antenna is the only antenna on Earth that can send commands to Voyager 2. It is managed in Australia by the Commonwealth Scientific and Industrial Research Organisation (CSIRO) for NASA’s Space Communications and Navigation program (SCaN) at NASA Headquarters in Washington, D.C.

Location
The complex is located in the Paddys River (a tributary of the Cotter River) valley, about 20 km from Canberra in the Australian Capital Territory. The complex is part of the Deep Space Network run by NASA's Jet Propulsion Laboratory (JPL). It is commonly referred to as the Tidbinbilla Deep Space Tracking Station and was officially opened on 19 March 1965 by then Prime Minister of Australia Sir Robert Menzies.

The station is separated from Canberra by the Murrumbidgee River and, more importantly, the Coolamon Ridge, Urambi Hills, and Bullen Range, which help shield the dishes from the city's radio frequency (RF) noise. Located nearby is the Tidbinbilla Nature Reserve.

Management
The CSIRO manages most of NASA's activities in Australia.

In February 2010 CSIRO took over direct management of the site with the establishment of CASS (CSIRO Astronomy and Space Science). Previous to this CDSCC had been managed by external sub-contractor organisations, such as Raytheon Australia from 2003–2010; BAE Systems (formerly British Aerospace Australia) 1990–2003; AWA Electronic Services -1990.

History 

During the mid 1960s NASA built three tracking stations in the Australian Capital Territory.

The Tidbinbilla Tracking Station (now known as CDSCC) was opened in 1965 and is the only NASA tracking station in Australia still in operation.  During the Apollo program, Tidbinbilla was used for tracking the Apollo Lunar Module.
The Orroral Valley Tracking Station was opened in May 1965 in what is now part of Namadgi National Park.  Its role was orbiting satellite support, although it also supported the Apollo-Soyuz Test Project in 1975. It was closed in 1985.
Honeysuckle Creek Tracking Station opened in 1967 and was built primarily to support the Apollo Moon missions, mainly communications with the Apollo Command Module. After the cancellation of the Apollo Project the station supported Skylab until its re-entry in 1979 when the station joined the Deep Space Network in support of the Viking and Voyager projects. 1981 saw the closure of the station and its 26 m antenna was moved to CDSCC to become known as Deep Space Station 46.  After the antenna was removed the rest of the facility was dismantled and knocked down.  Its foundation, access road and parking area are all that remains of the facility.

Antennas 
As of late 2016 the station has five large antennas, called Deep Space Stations (DSS), each identified by a number: DSS-34, DSS-35, DSS-36, DSS-43, and DSS-45. The CDSCC also uses the Parkes radio telescope in central New South Wales at busy times to receive data from spacecraft (then designated DSS-49). There has been ongoing construction since 2010 building additional 34 m beam waveguide antenna. Construction of DSS-35 began in July 2010. The station's collimation tower is located approximately 3 km to the north-west, on Black Hill.

Funding

See also

 Carnarvon Tracking Station
 OTC Satellite Earth Station Carnarvon
 Parkes Observatory

References

External links

 Partners in space: CSIRO and NASA - video
 Official CDSCC Webpage
 Official CSIRO pages
 Tidbinbilla Tracking Station tribute site
 Honeysuckle Creek tribute site
NASA's GRO Remote Terminal System Installed at Canberra Deep Space Communication Complex

Earth stations in the Australian Capital Territory
Space programme of Australia
Deep Space Network
1965 establishments in Australia
CSIRO
NASA facilities in Australia